Galbay is a rural locality (a selo) in Tunkinsky District, Republic of Buryatia, Russia. The population was 462 as of 2010. There are 6 streets.

Geography 
Galbay is located 45 km northeast of Kyren (the district's administrative centre) by road. Tabalangut is the nearest rural locality.

References 

Rural localities in Tunkinsky District